The Holy Woman is an English language novel by Pakistani-British novelist Qaisra Shahraz first published in 2001 and is the debut novel of the author. The novel deals with the themes of the deeply rooted issues of a Pakistani society such as women rights, feudalism and feminism. Set in contemporary Pakistan (Sindh), London and Egypt, the story revolves around a 28-years old brave, bold and beautiful Zarri Bano, the daughter of a wealthy landowner who stands against the injustice and shows resilience.

References 

2001 debut novels
2001 British novels
Pakistani novels